Waterhouses may refer to:

Waterhouses, County Durham
Waterhouses (County Durham) railway station
Waterhouses, Staffordshire
Waterhouses (Staffordshire) railway station

See also
Waterhouse  (disambiguation)